Robert Anthony Molloy (born 1975) is the Chief United States district judge of the District Court of the Virgin Islands and former judge of the United States Virgin Islands Superior Court.

Education 

Molloy earned a Bachelor of Science degree from Hampton University, a Juris Doctor from American University's Washington College of Law, and a Master of Business Administration from the American University Kogod School of Business.

Legal career 

Molloy served as a law clerk to Judge Raymond L. Finch of the District Court of the Virgin Islands. He also served as an Assistant Attorney General of Labor in the Virgin Islands Office of Collective Bargaining.

Judicial service 

On July 27, 2013, Governor John de Jongh Jr. announced Molloy as a nominee for the St. Croix District of the United States Virgin Islands Superior Court. From 2013 to 2020, he served as a Judge of the United States Virgin Islands Superior Court.

Federal judicial service 

On May 29, 2019, President Trump announced his intent to nominate Molloy to serve as a judge of the District Court of the Virgin Islands. On June 12, 2019, his nomination was sent to the Senate. President Trump nominated Molloy to the seat occupied by Judge Curtis V. Gomez, whose term of appointment—ten years and until his successor is "chosen and qualified"—was set to expire. His nomination was supported by Delegate Stacey Plaskett. On June 26, 2019, a hearing on his nomination was held before the Senate Judiciary Committee. On July 18, 2019, his nomination was reported out of committee by a voice vote. On February 24, 2020, the Senate invoked cloture on his nomination by a 88–1 vote. On February 25, 2020, his nomination was confirmed by a 97–0 vote. He assumed office on April 27, 2020. He became Chief Judge on April 27, 2021.

References

External links 
 

1975 births
Living people
21st-century American lawyers
21st-century American judges
African-American lawyers
African-American judges
Hampton University alumni
Judges of the United States District Court of the Virgin Islands
Kogod School of Business alumni
People from Saint Croix, U.S. Virgin Islands
United States district court judges appointed by Donald Trump
United States Virgin Islands lawyers
Washington College of Law alumni